Jean-François Baldé (born 29 November 1950) is a French former professional Grand Prix motorcycle road racer.

Born in Mulhouse, France, Baldé had his most successful year in 1981 when he won the Argentine Grand Prix and finished in second place in the 250cc world championship behind Anton Mang. He won three races in 1982 riding for Kawasaki and ended the season ranked third in the 350 class. Baldé won five Grand Prix races during his career.

Motorcycle Grand Prix results
Points system from 1968 to 1987

Points system from 1988 to 1992

(key) (Races in bold indicate pole position; races in italics indicate fastest lap)

References

1950 births
Living people
Sportspeople from Mulhouse
French motorcycle racers
250cc World Championship riders
350cc World Championship riders
500cc World Championship riders